Joseph Mantello (born December 27, 1962) is an American actor and director known for his work on Broadway productions of Wicked, Take Me Out, and Assassins, having gained notoriety in the 1993 cast of Angels in America.

Early life and education
Mantello was born in Rockford, Illinois, the son of Judy and Richard Mantello, an accountant. His father is of Italian ancestry and his mother is of half Italian descent. He was raised Catholic.

Mantello studied at the North Carolina School of the Arts; he started the Edge Theater in New York City with actress Mary-Louise Parker and writer Peter Hedges. He is a member of the Naked Angels theater company and an associate artist at the Roundabout Theatre Company.

Career
Mantello came to New York from Illinois in 1984 in the midst of the AIDS crisis, having overcome a youthful feeling, he admitted to a reporter in 2013, that "for some reason I was deeply ashamed of the theater early on. I think it had to do with this growing sense I was gay, although I couldn’t have put a word to it back then. Where I grew up, boys played sports. When [teacher] Mrs. Windsor wrote in my yearbook, 'Have you ever considered a career in the theater?' it was literally like she wrote the word 'faggot'."

Mantello began his theatrical career as an actor in Keith Curran's Walking the Dead and Paula Vogel's The Baltimore Waltz. On the transition from acting to directing, Mantello said, "I think I've become a better actor since I started directing, although some people might disagree. Since I've been removed from the process I see things that actors fall into. Now there's a part of me that's removed from the process and can stand back."

Mantello directs a variety of theatre works, as The New York Times noted: "Very few American directors – Jack O'Brien and Mike Nichols come to mind – successfully jump genres and styles the way Mr. Mantello does, moving from a two-hander like Frankie and Johnny in the Clair de Lune to the huge canvas of a mainstream musical comedy like Wicked, from downtown stand-up (The Santaland Diaries) to contemporary opera (Dead Man Walking) to political performance art (The Vagina Monologues)."

A Roundabout Theatre Company revival of Lips Together, Teeth Apart directed by Mantello was scheduled to open at the American Airlines Theatre in April 2010, when one of the stars, Megan Mullally, suddenly quit. The production was postponed indefinitely due to her departure.

Mantello directed the Jon Robin Baitz play Other Desert Cities at the Booth Theater in 2011. He returned to acting for the first time in over a decade with the role of Ned Weeks in the Broadway limited engagement revival of The Normal Heart in April 2011, for which he was nominated for the Tony Award as Best Performance by an Actor in a Leading Role in a Play. Mantello had previously been nominated for the Tony Award for his role as Louis in Angels in America.

He directed the Off-Broadway world premiere of the musical Dogfight in the summer of 2012 at the Second Stage Theater. In January 2013, he directed the Broadway premiere of Sharr White's The Other Place at the Samuel J. Friedman Theatre. In 2014 he directed Sting's new musical The Last Ship. He directed the Harvey Fierstein play Casa Valentina, which premiered on Broadway in April 2014.

Mantello acted in the revival of The Glass Menagerie which opened on Broadway at the Belasco Theatre in February 2017. Directed by Sam Gold, the play starred Sally Field as Amanda Wingfield, with Mantello playing Tom.

In 2018, Joe Mantello was inducted into the American Theater Hall of Fame.

Personal life 
From 1990 to 2002, Mantello was in a relationship with playwright Jon Robin Baitz. As of 2018, he lives with Paul Marlow, who owns a custom clothing company in Manhattan.

Theatre credits

As an actor

As a director

Filmography

Film

Television

Awards and nominations

Notes

See also
 LGBT culture in New York City
 List of LGBT people from New York City

References

External links

 Joe Mantello at the American Theatre Wing
 1992 BOMB Magazine interview with Joe Mantello by Nicole Burdette 

1962 births
Living people
American male stage actors
American theatre directors
Broadway theatre directors
Drama Desk Award winners
American gay actors
Helpmann Award winners
Actors from Rockford, Illinois
Tony Award winners
Male actors from Illinois
LGBT people from Illinois
American people of Italian descent
University of North Carolina School of the Arts alumni
20th-century American male actors
21st-century American male actors